"Coming for You" is a song by the American punk rock band The Offspring. It was premiered on Radio Contraband on January 30, 2015, and posted on YouTube and made available for digital download the same day. "Coming for You" was the Offspring's second official new release (following the 2014 covers EP Summer Nationals) since Days Go By (2012), and a modified version of the song appeared six years later on the band's tenth studio album, Let the Bad Times Roll (2021), with minor changes to the lyrics. The single climbed on various Billboard rock charts, reaching No. 1 on Mainstream Rock (the band's first since "Gone Away" in 1997), top 20 on Alternative Songs, and top 25 on overall Hot Rock Songs.

At first it was uncertain if "Coming for You" would be a one-off single or would appear on the band's then-upcoming tenth studio album, but a tweet from frontman Dexter Holland heavily implied the album was in an unfinished state. The Offspring toured worldwide in support of the single. The song was named the official theme song for the WWE Elimination Chamber 2015.

Videos
Accompanying the song's release was a video featuring still photos of the band performing at various venues and festivals around the world, interspersed with crowd shots. On March 18, 2015, the official music video was released. The video features a fight club, but with clowns. The band does not appear in the video.

Reception
In a positive review, Zumic.com called the song a "mid-tempo punk anthem" with "aggressive distorted guitar chords." It also commented, "thick bass lines are strong, and drummer Pete Parada’s power behind the kit is relentless. The tune sounds fresh and alive, and proves that the band can still deliver high energy punk anthems." By mid April, "Coming For You" climbed to No. 1 on US Mainstream Rock, the band's second after "Gone Away".

Chart performance

Weekly charts

Year-end charts

Personnel
 Dexter Holland – lead vocals, rhythm guitar, bass guitar (album version)
 Kevin Wasserman (aka Noodles) – lead guitar, backing vocals
 Greg K. – bass guitar, backing vocals (single version)
 Pete Parada – drums, percussion

References

The Offspring songs
2015 songs
2015 singles
Song recordings produced by Bob Rock
Songs written by Dexter Holland